Eternal Recurrence is an EP by Deradoorian, a former member of Dirty Projectors. Recorded between 2015 and 2016, it was released on Anticon on October 6, 2017.

Critical reception

At Metacritic, which assigns a weighted average score out of 100 to reviews from mainstream critics, Eternal Recurrence received an average score of 72, based on 5 reviews, indicating "generally favorable reviews".

Paul Simpson of AllMusic gave Eternal Recurrence 3.5 stars out of 5, calling it "a fine, thoughtful piece of ambient drone-folk that is as challenging as it is assuring." He said, "The release clocks in at less than half an hour, but its meditative nature transcends time, and it feels like a complete work rather than a minor batch of non-album tracks." Scott A. Gray of Exclaim! gave Eternal Recurrence a 7 out of 10, stating that "[Eternal Recurrence] pulls back on the rhythmic side of her intercontinental folkloric psychedelia in favour of something more meditative, untethered and texturally focused."

Track listing

Personnel
Credits adapted from liner notes.

 Angel Deradoorian – production, additional recording
 Ben Greenberg – arrangement (3), production, engineering, mixing
 Dave Cooley – mastering
 Safwan Dahoul – artwork
 Low Limit – layout

References

External links
 

2017 EPs
Anticon EPs